Austin Krajicek and Tennys Sandgren were the defending champions, but chose not to defend their title.
Julien Benneteau and Édouard Roger-Vasselin won an all French final, beating Grégoire Barrère and Tristan Lamasine 7–6(7–4), 3–6, [10–5]

Seeds

Draw

Draw

References
 Main Draw

BNP Paribas de Nouvelle-Caledonie – Doubles
Internationaux de Nouvelle-Calédonie